Jaziel Alberto Orozco Landeros (born 2 June 2004) is a Mexican professional footballer who plays as a centre-back for Liga MX club Santos Laguna on loan from Major League Soccer club Real Salt Lake.

Club career
Born in Ciudad Juárez, Orozco was raised in El Paso, Texas. He is the son of former professional footballer, Alberto Orozco. Prior to joining the Real Salt Lake youth setup, Orozco had participated in trials with Liga MX clubs Tigres UANL and Santos Laguna. He also played with Intercups MX, a club side which played in tournaments around the world and the Dallas Cup. In 2019, Orozco was selected to join a trial for the Real Salt Lake youth academy and passed.

On October 4, 2020, Orozco was called in to Real Monarchs, an affiliate club of Real Salt Lake, for their match against El Paso Locomotive but did not come off the bench. On April 7, 2021, Orozco received his first appearance with the main team in their pre-season match against Phoenix Rising. He then made his professional debut on May 8, 2021 for Real Monarchs in their USL Championship opener against San Antonio FC, starting in the 2–2 draw. Following the match, Orozco signed a professional contract with Real Monarchs.

On January 13, 2022, Orozco signed a homegrown player contract with Real Salt Lake.

On March 26, 2022, Orozco made his Major League Soccer debut for Real Salt Lake after begging subbed on at halftime for defender Erik Holt.

Career statistics

References

External links
 Profile at USL Championship

2004 births
Living people
Soccer players from El Paso, Texas
Mexican footballers
American soccer players
Association football defenders
Real Monarchs players
USL Championship players
Real Salt Lake players
Homegrown Players (MLS)
Major League Soccer players
MLS Next Pro players